Change of Address is the ninth studio album by the Swiss hard rock band Krokus, and is largely seen to be their least successful. It has been described as "plainly one of the worst efforts" from Krokus, and the band's website claims that they and their musical style were put under too much pressure from their record company. Unsurprisingly, Krokus changed their record label for their next studio album, Heart Attack.

The album features drummer Jeff Klaven's former Cobra bandmate, Tommy Keiser, joining on bass, enabling Mark Kohler to return to his original position on rhythm guitar.

Andrew T of N.Y. metal band Blackout filled in for Kohler on select dates during this tour, including a stint replacing Bon Jovi as openers on Judas Priest's 1986 arena tour. Unusually, Krokus rarely played any songs from the then current album when opening for Priest.

Track listing 
All songs by Fernando von Arb, Jeff Klaven, Marc Storace, except where noted.

Side one
 "Now (All Through the Night)" – 4:23
 "Hot Shot City" (Tommy Keiser, Mark Kohler, Klaven, Storace) – 3:48
 "School's Out" (Alice Cooper, Michael Bruce, Glen Buxton, Dennis Dunaway, Neal Smith) – 3:16 (Alice Cooper cover)
 "Let This Love Begin" (von Arb, Klaven) – 5:02
 "Burning Up the Night" (von Arb, Storace) – 3:46

Side two
"Say Goodbye" – 5:18
 "World on Fire" – 6:12
 "Hard Luck Hero" – 4:12
 "Long Way from Home" – 5:06

Personnel 
Krokus
 Marc Storace – vocals
 Fernando von Arb – lead guitar, co-producer
 Mark Kohler – rhythm guitar
 Tommy Keiser – bass
 Jeff Klaven – drums, percussion
 Paul Fox – keyboards on certain tracks
 Jai Winding – keyboards on certain tracks

Additional musicians
 Leon Gaer – bass
 Allan Holdsworth – guitar solo on track 9
 David Mansfield – acoustic guitar
 'The Brat Choir' with Nina Werman and friends – backing vocals on track 3
Tom Kelly, Tommy Funderburk, Bob Garlyle – backing vocals

Production
Tom Werman – producer, mixing at Cherokee Studios, Hollywood, California
Duane Baron – engineer
Peter Barker – assistant engineer
David Eaton – mixing assistant
Jürg Naegeli – pre-production engineer at Pink Tonstudios, Zuchwil, Switzerland

Charts

Album

Singles

References 

Krokus (band) albums
1986 albums
Albums produced by Tom Werman
Arista Records albums